Kadok is a village in Daik-U Township, Bago District, in the Bago Region of southern Burma.

Notes
လဘလလ

External links
"Kadok Map — Satellite Images of Kadok" Maplandia World Gazetteer

Populated places in Bago Region